Spill were a British dance duo, whose members were William Orbit and Beth Orton. They released one single under the moniker, "Don't Wanna Know About Evil" in 1993, on Virgin Records, initially to the Japanese market. It was released in the UK, several years later.

English dance music groups
English musical duos
Male–female musical duos